Channel 42 may refer to:

 "Channel 42" (instrumental), a 2013 instrumental by deadmau5 and Wolfgang Gartner from the album Album Title Goes Here

See also
 Channel 42 virtual TV stations in Canada
 Channel 42 virtual TV stations in the United States
For UHF frequencies covering 639.25-643.75 MHz:
 Channel 42 TV stations in Canada
 Channel 42 TV stations in Mexico
 Channel 42 digital TV stations in the United States
 Channel 42 low-power TV stations in the United States

42